Dachen is a town of Wuji County in west-central Hebei province, China, located about  northeast of the county seat. , it has 13 villages under its administration.

See also
List of township-level divisions of Hebei

References

Township-level divisions of Hebei